Roslyakovo was an urban locality (an urban-type settlement) under the administrative jurisdiction of the closed-administrative territorial formation of Severomorsk in Murmansk Oblast, Russia, located on the Kola Peninsula on the Kola Bay,  west of Severomorsk proper. It was abolished, with its territory merged into the city of Murmansk, on January 1, 2015. Population:

History
It was founded in 1896. The colony of Roslyakovo was one of the twenty-one included into Alexandrovskaya Volost of Alexandrovsky Uyezd, Arkhangelsk Governorate upon its establishment on July 1, 1920. Urban-type settlement status was granted to Roslyakovo in 1959.

Roslyakovo was in jurisdiction of the closed administrative-territorial formation of Severomorsk until January 1, 2015, when it was abolished, with its territory merged into the city of Murmansk.

There is no restaurant or cafe in town. Formerly, there was a medical clinic. There are "a few 7-Eleven-sized grocery stores."
The Church of St. Michael the Archangel, founded in 1991, is the only church in the town.

Most of the population are in the Russian Navy, or work as navy contractors. Shipbuilding is a local industry. After merging and enlarging two graving docks for the aircraft carrier Admiral Kuznetsov, Roslyakovo has the largest drydock in European Russia. Rosneft, the state owned oil company, is opening facilities in the town.

Citations

Official website of Murmansk Oblast. Registry of the Administrative-Territorial Structure of Murmansk Oblast 

1896 establishments in the Russian Empire
2015 disestablishments in Russia
Abolished inhabited localities in Murmansk Oblast
Murmansk
Populated coastal places in Russia
Populated places disestablished in 2015
Populated places established in 1896
Kolsky Uyezd